Andy C. Saxton is a musician, producer and film composer from Watford, England. He has worked alongside many famous bands and musicians including Bon Jovi, Sepultura, Alexisonfire, Jimmy Eat World. Saxton was also the bassist for the Progressive Metal band Cry For Silence for eight years with the new Slipknot bassist Alessandro Venturella. Saxton has played on albums with Ryan Richards from Funeral For a Friend and Charlie Simpson from Busted/Fightstar

Influences
According to an interview published in Bass Guitar magazine, Saxton's main influences are Alain Caron, Jaco Pastorius, Ryan Martinie, Stuart Zender, Les Claypool and Flea.

Discography
 Through The Precious Words (2001) with Cry For Silence
 The Longest Day Mighty Atom Records (2004) with Cry For Silence
 The Glorious Dead Visible Noise (2008) with Cry For Silence
 Takin Over Plastic Head Distribution (2009) with New Device
 The Shape Of Things To Come Basick Records (2017) with First Signs Of Frost

References

People from Watford
Living people
Progressive metal musicians
Year of birth missing (living people)
British rock guitarists
British male guitarists
British producers